Stephani Danelle Perry (born March 14, 1970) is an American science fiction and horror writer, publishing works as S. D. Perry and Stephani Perry. She has contributed tie-in works to several long-running franchises, including Resident Evil, Star Trek, Aliens, and Predator.

Personal life 
Her father is television and science fiction writer Steve Perry.

Perry, who prefers the name Danelle, lives in Portland, Oregon with her family.

Bibliography

Short fiction (1991–2017)

Aliens (1993–2016)

Aliens vs. Predator (1994)

Resident Evil (1998–2004)

Star Trek (2001–2010)

Uncharted 

Uncharted (2021)

Notes

References

External links 
 

1970 births
Living people
20th-century American novelists
21st-century American novelists
20th-century American women writers
21st-century American women writers
American women novelists
American science fiction writers
Writers from Portland, Oregon
Women science fiction and fantasy writers
Novelists from Oregon